This is a list of submachine guns.

It includes Submachine guns (SMG), Machine pistols (MP), Personal defense weapon systems (PDW), and  "compact submachine gun-like weapons" not easily categorized. Weapons may fit in more than one category.

See also
 List of PDWs
 List of machine pistols
 List of firearms
 List of weapons
 List of bolt-action rifles
 List of carbines
 List of bullpup firearms
 List of machine guns
 List of assault rifles
 List of sniper rifles
 List of shotguns
 List of pistols
 List of revolvers
 List of semi-automatic pistols

References

Submachine guns